University Grants Committee  may refer to:

University Grants Committee (Hong Kong)
University Grants Committee (United Kingdom)
Universities New Zealand

See also
 University Grants Commission (disambiguation)
 Higher Education Commission (disambiguation)